East Bronson is a census-designated place (CDP) in Levy County, Florida, United States. The population was 1,945 at the 2010 census.

Geography
East Bronson is located at  (29.453809, -82.594377).

Demographics

As of the census of 2000, there were 1,075 people, 394 households, and 293 families residing in the CDP. The racial makeup of the CDP was 86.23% White, 5.77% African American, 0.56% Native American, 0.28% Asian, 4.28% from other races, and 2.88% from two or more races. Hispanic or Latino of any race were 11.16% of the population.

There were 394 households, out of which 37.3% had children under the age of 18 living with them, 54.8% were married couples living together, 13.7% had a female householder with no husband present, and 25.6% were non-families. 21.6% of all households were made up of individuals, and 10.2% had someone living alone who was 65 years of age or older.  The average household size was 2.73 and the average family size was 3.14.

In the CDP, the population was spread out, with 29.2% under the age of 18, 6.2% from 18 to 24, 29.9% from 25 to 44, 21.3% from 45 to 64, and 13.4% who were 65 years of age or older.  The median age was 35 years. For every 100 females, there were 93.0 males.  For every 100 females age 18 and over, there were 92.7 males.

The median income for a household in the CDP was $25,833, and the median income for a family was $26,853. Males had a median income of $21,691 versus $18,194 for females. The per capita income for the CDP was $12,611.  About 8.6% of families and 15.2% of the population were below the poverty line, including 21.5% of those under age 18 and 11.7% of those age 65 or over.

References

Census-designated places in Levy County, Florida
Census-designated places in Florida